A partial solar eclipse occurred at the Moon’s descending node of the orbit on September 11, 2007. A solar eclipse occurs when the Moon passes between Earth and the Sun, thereby totally or partly obscuring the image of the Sun for a viewer on Earth. A partial solar eclipse occurs in the polar regions of the Earth when the center of the Moon's shadow misses the Earth.

Eclipse season 

This is the second eclipse this season, the first being the August 2007 lunar eclipse.

Images

Gallery

Related eclipses

Eclipses of 2007 
 A total lunar eclipse on March 3.
 A partial solar eclipse on March 19.
 A total lunar eclipse on August 28.
 A partial solar eclipse on September 11.

Solar eclipses 2004–2007

Metonic series

References

 NASA graphics
NASA map

External links
Partial Solar Eclipse, September 11, 2007 from Buenos Aires, Argentina by Jay Pasachoff

2007 09 11
2007 in science
2007 09 11
September 2007 events